Joseph Eneojo Akpala (born 24 August 1986) is a Nigerian professional footballer who plays as a forward.

Club career 
Akpala is a product of the Pepsi Football Academy in Lagos. His first professional contract came in April 2003 with Bendel United Football Club, a Division One club in Benin City. He later joined Bendel Insurance FC, Benin City in the Premier Division of the Nigerian Professional League, in February 2005. He was to finish as joint top scorer with 13 goals in 19 games.

Subsequently, Akpala was signed by the Royal Charleroi S.C. of Belgian Jupiler Pro League in January 2006. He wore the number 27 jersey. He had a very successful campaign in 2007–08 as he topped the scorers chart with 18 goals. On 18 July 2008, Akpala joined Club Brugge signing a contract until 2013.

On 22 August 2012, Bundesliga club Werder Bremen signed Akpala after facing competition from West Ham United and Celtic. On 19 August 2013, Akpala began a week-long trial with English Championship side Reading.

On 3 September 2013, Akpala signed for Turkish Karabükspor on a season loan. In 2014 the deal was made permanent and he left Bremen for good.

However, only after another year, in July 2015, he returned to Belgium, signing for K.V. Oostende on a three-year-contract.

In April 2021, he joined Romanian club Dinamo București, signing a contract until the end of the 2020-21 season.

International career
Akpala made his debut for Nigeria against South Africa on 6 September 2008. In June 2009, he scored his first goal for Nigeria in a 1–0 away win against France in Saint-Étienne.

He was selected for Nigeria's squad at the 2013 FIFA Confederations Cup.

Career statistics

Club

International

Score and result list Nigeria's goal tally first, score column indicates score after Akpala goal.

Honours
KV Oostende
Belgian Cup: runner-up 2016–17

Individual
 Belgian First Division top scorer: 2007–08 (16 goals)

References

External links 
 
 

1986 births
Living people
Sportspeople from Jos
Association football forwards
Nigerian footballers
Nigeria international footballers
Nigerian expatriate footballers
Pepsi Football Academy players
Bendel United F.C. players
Bendel Insurance F.C. players
R. Charleroi S.C. players
Club Brugge KV players
SV Werder Bremen players
Kardemir Karabükspor footballers
K.V. Oostende players
Al-Faisaly FC players
FC Dinamo București players
Nigeria Professional Football League players
Belgian Pro League players
Bundesliga players
Süper Lig players
Saudi Professional League players
Liga I players
Nigerian expatriate sportspeople in Belgium
Nigerian expatriate sportspeople in Germany
Nigerian expatriate sportspeople in Saudi Arabia
Nigerian expatriate sportspeople in Turkey
Nigerian expatriate sportspeople in Romania
Expatriate footballers in Belgium
Expatriate footballers in Germany
Expatriate footballers in Saudi Arabia
Expatriate footballers in Turkey
Expatriate footballers in Romania
2013 FIFA Confederations Cup players